Brazil has some of the strictest smoking laws in South America. Smoking in Brazil is forbidden in all enclosed public spaces except for specifically designated smoking areas. Since 15 December 2011, Federal Law 12546 (article 49) forbids smoking in enclosed spaces in the entire country, including restaurants and bars.

In Brazil, the legal age for sale and consumption of tobacco is 18. Tobacco advertising is restricted to posters in shops, and is banned on television and radio. All cigarette packs contain advertisements against smoking and government warnings about possible adverse health effects of smoking.

Descriptors on packaging
In 2001, Brazil  outlawed the usage of descriptors, such as "light", "low tar" and "ultra-light".

Flavored cigarettes
In 2012, Brazil  outlawed flavored cigarettes, including menthol cigarettes, although the prohibition was  revoked in 2013 by Rosa Weber, a judge of the Supreme Court.

São Paulo
São Paulo  became the first state in Brazil to adopt the most comprehensive ban, being followed by Rio de Janeiro and Minas Gerais. Under the new regulation there are no smoking sections in any place around the state. The law became effective from 7 August 2009 with smoking forbidden in all indoor and enclosed public spaces such as bars and restaurants, clubs, shopping malls, movie theatres, banks, supermarkets, bakeries, chemist shops, health places, government offices and schools.

Smoking is also no longer allowed in São Paulo in work and study places, libraries, buses, cabs, commercial and residential common areas, hotels and inns.

The São Paulo government has trained 500 specialised agents to make sure the rule is respected at all times. The first team was trained to measure ambient smoke in an area and to warn smokers about the risks for their health.

Anybody caught violating the law is charged with a fine. Public sites can be punished with a maximum fine of R$ 1,585  (Brazilian currency, ~$USD 478). If there is a second infraction, the site is closed. According to surveys, 88% of São Paulo's inhabitants support the smoke-free law.

References

Brazilian legislation
Brazil
Health in Brazil